A Escrava Isaura may refer to:

A Escrava Isaura (novel), an 1875 novel by Bernardo Guimarães
A Escrava Isaura (1949 film), a Brazilian film of 1949
Escrava Isaura (1976 TV series), an adaptation of the novel produced by Rede Globo
A Escrava Isaura (2004 TV series), an adaptation of the novel produced by Rede Record